Manilal Gandhi (1892–1956) was a South African writer and activist.

Manilal may also refer to:
Arun Manilal Gandhi ( 1934), an Indian-American activist, son of Manilal Gandhi
Mani Lal Bhaumik (b. 1931), an Indian-American physicist and author
Manilal Dand, an Indian businessman
Manilal Desai (1939–1966), an Indian poet
Manilal Ambalal Desai (1878–1926), an Indian-born Kenyan journalist and politician
Manilal Doctor (1881–1956), an Indian lawyer and politician
Manilal Dwivedi (1858–1898), an Indian writer, poet and philosopher
Sunil Manilal Kothari, an Indian dance historian
K. S. Manilal (b. 1938), an Indian botanist
Manilal Nag (b. 1939), an Indian musician
Pransukh Manilal Nayak (1910–1989), an Indian actor, director and playwright
Manilal C. Parekh (1885–1967), an Indian Christian theologian
Harilal Manilal Patel (b. 1941), a Fiji Indian lawyer and politician
Manilal H. Patel (b. 1949), an Indian writer
Manilal Chaturbhai Shah, an Indian politician
Jaishanker Manilal Shelat (1908–1985), a Supreme Court of India judge